Vacation Days is a 1947 American Western musical film directed by Arthur Dreifuss and starring Freddie Stewart, June Preisser, and Frankie Darro. It is part of The Teen Agers series.

Plot
Miss Hinklefink (Belle Mitchell) inherits a western ranch and, in order to spend the summer with Professor Owen Townley (Milton Kibbee), she invites students Freddie Trimball (Freddie Stewart), Dodie Rogers (June Preisser), Betty Rogers (Noel Neill), Lee Watson (Warren Mills) and Roy Donne (Frankie Darro) to spend their vacation on the ranch if Townley will help chaperone the kids. Real estate agent Tom Sneed (Hugh Prosser) tries to persuade her to send the kids home when desperadoes rob the bank. In the saloon, Sneed's henchman Charlie (Terry Frost) mistakes Freddie for a baby-faced killer, who was blamed for a murder actually committed by Sneed, and ranch foreman Big Jim (John Hart), also working for Sneed, tries to kill Freddie.

Cast
 Freddie Stewart as Freddie Trimball
 June Preisser as Dodie Rogers
 Frankie Darro as Roy Donne
 Warren Mills as Lee Watson
 Noel Neill as Betty Rogers
 Milton Kibbee as Professor Owen Townley 
 Belle Mitchell as Miss Hinklefink
 John Hart as Big Jim
 Hugh Prosser as Tom Sneed
 Terry Frost as Charlie
 Edythe Elliott as Mrs. Rogers
 Claire James as Indian Girl
 Spade Cooley as Spade Cooley
 Jerry Wald as	Orchestra Leader Jerry Wald
 Spade Cooley Bandas as Western Band
 Jerry Wald and His Orchestra as Jerry Wald's Orchestra
 Forrest Taylor as Sheriff

References

External links
 Vacation Days at IMDb

1947 films
1947 musical films
1940s teen films
1940s Western (genre) musical films
American black-and-white films
American musical films
American Western (genre) musical films
Films about vacationing
Films directed by Arthur Dreifuss
Monogram Pictures films
1940s English-language films
1940s American films